4-Bromo-2,5-dimethoxy-1-benzylpiperazine (2C-B-BZP) is a psychoactive drug and research chemical of the piperazine chemical class which has been sold as a "designer drug". It produces stimulant effects similar to those of benzylpiperazine (BZP).

Chemistry 

2C-B-BZP contains a benzylpiperazine base as well as the ring-substitution pattern of the psychedelic phenethylamine 2C-B. 2C-B-BZP is not a phenethylamine itself and does not produce psychedelic effects, as the binding groups are in the wrong position to activate the 5-HT2A receptor, while the phenylpiperazine homologue 2C-B-PP substitutes for DOM in DOM-trained rats with around one-tenth the potency of DOM, but does not substitute for TFMPP.

Effects 

2C-B-BZP produces stimulant effects which last 3–6 hours. It is also said by several sources to increase the effects of other compounds when combined . Side effects include headaches and nausea, similar to those of other recreationally-used piperazine derivatives.

Legality 

2C-B-BZP is unscheduled and uncontrolled in the United States, but possession and sale of 2C-B-BZP could possibly be prosecuted under the Federal Analog Act because of its structural similarities to benzylpiperazine. 2C-B-BZP is illegal to possess, use or sell in Japan where it used to be sold in local smartshops.

See also 
 Substituted piperazine

References 

Piperazines
Stimulants
Designer drugs
Bromoarenes
O-methylated phenols